Bohdan Osadchuk  (1 August 1920 – 19 October 2011) was a Ukrainian diaspora historian and journalist.

Osadchuk was born in Kolomyia.  He was a professor at the Free University of Berlin,  one of the most senior members of the Ukrainian Free University (UFU) of Munich, and a long-standing freelance writer for Kultura, a Polish emigre magazine published in Paris (editor Jerzy Giedroyc). In 2009 he was awarded a Bene Merito Honour medal by Foreign Minister Radosław Sikorski in recognition of scientific achievements and efforts to Polish-Ukrainian reconciliation.

He died in Czechówka near Myślenice situated in the Lesser Poland Voivodeship.

He was an honorary doctorate of National University of Kyiv-Mohyla Academy since 2006.

References

1920 births
2011 deaths
Soviet emigrants to Germany
People from Kolomyia
Commanders of the Order of Merit of the Republic of Poland
Recipients of the Order of the White Eagle (Poland)
People associated with the magazine "Kultura"